Todd Fork is a stream in Clinton and Warren counties, Ohio, in the United States. It is a tributary of the Little Miami River.

Todd Fork was likely named in the 18th century for the Todd family of pioneer settlers. A variant name is "Todds Fork".

It is spanned by the Martinsville Road Covered Bridge, which is listed on the National Register of Historic Places.

Location

Mouth: Confluence with the Little Miami River at Morrow 
Origin: Clinton County east of Wilmington

See also
List of rivers of Ohio

References

Rivers of Clinton County, Ohio
Rivers of Warren County, Ohio
Rivers of Ohio